Jat's Incline is a road in Wong Tai Sin District, Kowloon, Hong Kong.

Location
Jat's Incline connects Clear Water Bay Road in the south to the junction of Shatin Pass Road and the western end Fei Ngo Shan Road, next to the top of Tate's Cairn in the north.

History
The road was built in 1907 by the 119th Infantry (later renamed the 2nd Battalion of the 9th Jat Regiment, abbreviated to “2/9 Jat Regt”) and repaired in 1932 by the 3rd Battalion of the 9th Jat Regiment (abbreviated to “3/9 Jat Regt”).

See also
 Good Hope School

External links

 Jat's Incline Marker Stone
 Walking up Jat Incline
 Mountain walk from Jat's Incline to Shatin

Roads in New Kowloon
Wong Tai Sin District